Walter Morosco (February 1, 1899 – December 30, 1948 ) was an American film producer, writer, actor and director.

Morosco was born in San Francisco, the son of theater impresario Oliver Morosco and grandson of Walter M. Morosco (1846-1901). He worked for United Artists and Fox Film Corporation before signing a contract with Twentieth Century-Fox.

Morosco was married and divorced three times: From 1924 to 1934 he was married to the actress Corinne Griffith. His other wives were Shirley Newman Listenwalter, with whom he had a son, Tim, and Marie M. O'Keefe,

Morosco died at the age of 49 after suffering a stroke.

Partial filmography
For Those We Love (1921)
Silken Shackles (1926) (*director)
The Divine Lady (1929)
Mammy (1930)
 Lilies of the Field (1930)
 A Man of Mayfair (1931)
Aren't We All? (1932)
Women Who Play (1932-producer)
 Lily Christine (1932)
Charlie Chan at the Wax Museum (1940)
Moon Over Her Shoulder (1941)
A Gentleman at Heart (1942)
Sunday Dinner for a Soldier (1944)
Sentimental Journey (1946)
Scudda Hoo! Scudda Hay! (1948)
Mother Is a Freshman (1949)

References

External links

Walter Morosco at TCM Movie Database

1899 births
1948 deaths
American film producers